The WWWA World Midget's Championship was a Midget wrestling singles title promoted by Professional wrestling promotion All Japan Women's Pro-Wrestling.

Title history

Footnotes

See also
Midgets' World Championship
CMLL World Mini-Estrella Championship
AAA World Mini-Estrella Championship
Mini-Estrella

References

All Japan Women's Pro-Wrestling Championships
Midget wrestling championships